Arundo plinii is a species of herb in the family Poaceae (True grasses).

Sources

References 

Flora of Malta
Arundinoideae